Cameron Ellis-Yolmen (born 28 January 1993) is a former professional Australian rules footballer, most recently playing for the Brisbane Lions in the Australian Football League (AFL), having played for the Adelaide Football Club from 2014 until 2019. He was drafted at pick 64 in the 2011 National Draft. Cam currently plays for the Wodonga Raiders in the Ovens & Murray Football League

Early life
Ellis-Yolmen was born in Adelaide, New South Wales to mother Kylie an Indigenous Australian from Koonibba on the west coast of South Australia. and father Ellis-Yolmen's father of Papua New Guinea. He moved to Adelaide in South Australia when he was very young.

Ellis-Yolmen played his junior football with 80 games at the Lockleys Football Club before playing senior football with Flinders Park Football Club in the SAAFL and Woodville West Torrens Football Club in the SANFL where he was noticed by recruiters from AFL club Adelaide.

AFL career
Despite having not yet played an AFL game, he was chosen in the Australian squad in the 2013 Indigenous International Rules series against Ireland. Whilst in Ireland, Ellis-Yolmen was the subject of controversy when he posted a photo of himself holding a rifle.

Ellis-Yolmen finally made his AFL debut in Round 12, 2014 against , playing as the substitute and gathering only five disposals. He was dropped to the SANFL the following week and dislocated his finger against , hindering his prospects of a recall. He did not play another AFL game in 2014, but impressed playing in the midfield in Adelaide's new reserves team, finishing fourth in the best and fairest and having the most disposals, clearances and tackles for the team.

Ellis-Yolmen started 2015 in Adelaide's best lineup, showing excellent form in averaging 20 disposals in the first five rounds. Afterwards his form tapered off and he was dropped after round 15.

He was delisted by Adelaide at the conclusion of the 2017 season but regained a place on their list for the 2018 season.

In the 2019 Trade period the Brisbane Lions signed Ellis-Yolmen as a unrestricted free agent with the Adelaide Crows receiving a third-round compensation pick.

In January 2022 Brisbane Lions moved Ellis-Yolmen to the Inactive List following his decision not to comply with the AFL's Covid vaccination requirements.

Personal life
Ellis-Yolmen's father is from Papua New Guinea, and his mother is an Indigenous Australian from Koonibba on the west coast of South Australia. Cam currently resides in Wodonga, working in the renewable energy sector for Next Generation Energy

Statistics
 Statistics are correct to end of Round 21 2020

|- style="background:#eaeaea;"
! scope="row" style="text-align:center" | 2014
| style="text-align:center" | 
| 28 || 1 || 0 || 0 || 2 || 3 || 5 || 1 || 0 || 0.0 || 0.0 || 2.0 || 3.0 || 5.0 || 1.0 || 0.0
|-
! scope="row" style="text-align:center" | 2015
| style="text-align:center" | 
| 28 || 11 || 3 || 5 || 91 || 85 || 176 || 23 || 53 || 0.3 || 0.5 || 8.3 || 7.7 || 16.0 || 2.1 || 4.8
|- style="background:#eaeaea;"
! scope="row" style="text-align:center" | 2016
| style="text-align:center" | 
| 28 || 2 || 4 || 3 || 14 || 17 || 31 || 7 || 9 || 2.0 || 1.5 || 7.0 || 8.5 || 15.5 || 3.5 || 4.5
|-
! scope="row" style="text-align:center" | 2018
| style="text-align:center" | 
| 28 || 15 || 6 || 3 || 134 || 168 || 302 || 46 || 82 || 0.4 || 0.2 || 8.9 || 11.2 || 20.1 || 3.1 || 5.5
|- style="background:#eaeaea;"
! scope="row" style="text-align:center" | 2019
| style="text-align:center" | 
| 28 || 10 || 2 || 2 || 100 || 135 || 235 || 29 || 56 || 0.2 || 0.2 || 10.0 || 13.5 || 23.5 || 2.9 || 5.6
|- style="background:#eaeaea;"
! scope="row" style="text-align:center" | 2020
| style="text-align:center" | 
| 28 || 9 || 3 || 2 || 50 || 48 || 98 || 18 || 23 || 0.3 || 0.2 || 5.6 || 5.3 || 10.9 || 2.0 || 2.6
|- style="background:#eaeaea;"
! scope="row" style="text-align:center" | 2021
| style="text-align:center" | 
| 28 || 0 || 0 || 0 || 0 || 0 || 0 || 0 || 0 || 0.0 || 0.0 || 0.0 || 0.0 || 0.0 || 0.0 || 0.0
|- class="sortbottom"
! colspan=3| Career
! 48
! 18
! 15
! 391
! 456
! 847
! 124
! 221
! 0.3
! 0.3
! 8.1
! 9.5
! 17.6
! 2.5
! 4.6
|}

References

External links

1993 births
Living people
Woodville-West Torrens Football Club players
Australian rules footballers from South Australia
Adelaide Football Club players
Indigenous Australian players of Australian rules football
Adelaide Football Club (SANFL) players
Australian people of Papua New Guinean descent
Australia international rules football team players
Brisbane Lions players